Rini van Woerden (26 March 1934 – 18 July 2004) was a Dutch footballer who was active as a midfielder. Van Woerden made his debut at Feyenoord and also played for DWS and Xerxes.

Honours
 1960-61 : Eredivisie winner with Feyenoord
 1962-63 : Eerste Divisie winner with DWS
 1964-65 : Promotion to Eerste Divisie with Xerxes
 1965-66 : Promotion to Eredivisie with Xerxes

See also
Football in Netherlands
List of football clubs in the Netherlands

References

External links
 Profile

1934 births
2004 deaths
Dutch footballers
German footballers
Feyenoord players
AFC DWS players
Association football midfielders
Eredivisie players
Footballers from Duisburg